Valley Academy for Career and Technology Education (VACTE) is a joint technological education district serving high schools in central Arizona. It is the smallest of Arizona's 13 JTEDs, serving just three high schools in three districts.

Member school districts
Camp Verde Unified School District
Mingus Union High School District
Sedona-Oak Creek Unified School District

External links

School districts in Yavapai County, Arizona